Malanta  is a town and sub-prefecture in the Gaoual Prefecture in the Boké Region of north-western Guinea. As of 2014 it had a population of 14,300 people.

References

Sub-prefectures of the Boké Region